GW–Shimano was a professional men's cycling team based in Colombia and founded in 2006, which competes in elite road bicycle racing events under UCI Continental rules.

Team roster

Major wins
2012
 Road Race Championships, Félix Cardenas
Stage 9 Vuelta Ciclista de Chile, Félix Cardenas
 Overall Vuelta a Colombia, Félix Cardenas
Stages 3, 4 & 10, Félix Cardenas
 Overall Vuelta a Costa Rica, Óscar Eduardo Sánchez
Stages 5 (ITT) & 7, Óscar Eduardo Sánchez
2016
Stage 8 Vuelta a Colombia, Frank Osorio
Stage 11 Vuelta a Colombia, Alexis Camacho
2017 
Stage 6 Vuelta a Costa Rica, Wilson Cardona
2018 
Stage 8 Vuelta al Táchira, Cristian Talero
Stage 9 Vuelta al Táchira, José Serpa

National champions
2012
 Colombian Road Race Championship, Félix Cardenas

References

Cycling teams based in Colombia
Defunct cycling teams based in Colombia
Cycling teams established in 2006
2006 establishments in Colombia
Cycling teams disestablished in 2019
2019 disestablishments in Colombia
UCI Continental Teams (America)